A kernel is a component of a computer operating system.  A comparison of system kernels can provide insight into the design and architectural choices made by the developers of particular operating systems.

Comparison criteria 
The following tables compare general and technical information for a number of widely used and currently available operating system kernels. Please see the individual products' articles for further information.

Even though there are a large number and variety of available Linux distributions, all of these kernels are grouped under a single entry in these tables, due to the differences among them being of the patch level. See comparison of Linux distributions for a detailed comparison. Linux distributions that have highly modified kernels — for example, real-time computing kernels — should be listed separately. There are also a wide variety of minor BSD operating systems, many of which can be found at comparison of BSD operating systems.

The tables specifically do not include subjective viewpoints on the merits of each kernel or operating system.

Feature overview 
The major contemporary general-purpose kernels are shown in comparison. Only an overview of the technical features is detailed.

Transport protocol support

In-kernel security

In-kernel virtualization

In-kernel server support

Binary format support 
A comparison of OS support for different binary formats (executables):

File system support 
Physical file systems:

Networked file system support

Supported CPU instruction sets and microarchitectures

Supported GPU processors

Supported kernel execution environment 
This table indicates, for each kernel, what operating systems' executable images and device drivers can be run by that kernel.

Supported cipher algorithms 
This may be usable on some situations like file system encrypting.

Supported compression algorithms 
This may be usable on some situations like compression file system.

Supported message digest algorithms

Supported Bluetooth protocols

See also 
Comparison of open-source operating systems
Comparison of Linux distributions
Comparison of BSD operating systems
Comparison of Microsoft Windows versions
List of operating systems
Comparison of file systems
Comparison of operating systems

Footnotes 

Kernels
Computing platforms
Operating system kernels